Clystea platyzona is a moth of the subfamily Arctiinae. It was described by Felder in 1869. It is found in Colombia.

References

Clystea
Moths described in 1869